Joseph Barbara may refer to: 

Joseph Barbara (actor) (born 1967), American actor
Joseph Barbara (mobster) (1905–1959), head of the Bufalino crime family and host of the Apalachin Conference

See also 

Joseph Barbera (1911–2006), American animator, artist, and co-founder of Hanna-Barbera